Inisha is a rural locality (a selo) in Khuninsky Selsoviet, Laksky District, Republic of Dagestan, Russia. The population was 131 as of 2010.

Geography 
Inisha is located 13 km southwest of Kumukh (the district's administrative centre) by road. Kani and Vikhli are the nearest rural localities.

Nationalities 
Laks live there.

References 

Rural localities in Laksky District